Richard de Lincoln was a medieval Anglo-Norman prelate. Although of English origin, he was a royal clerk in the administration of King William of Scotland. With royal support, he was elected Bishop of Moray on 1 March 1187 and was consecrated at St Andrews on 15 March by Bishop Hugh. His appointment during the rebellion of Donald MacWilliam in the north was to a dilapidated diocese.  Only after MacWilliam's defeat in July could Bishop Richard begin the strengthening of his see.   His episcopate marked an increase in royal patronage directed at the diocese of Moray. He witnessed many charters during his episcopate. He died in 1203, and was succeeded by Bricius de Douglas.

References
 Dowden, John, The Bishops of Scotland, ed. J. Maitland Thomson, (Glasgow, 1912)
 Fawcett, Richard & Oram, Richard, Elgin Cathedral and the Diocese of Moray, Historic Scotland (Edinburgh, 2014), 
 Keith, Robert, An Historical Catalogue of the Scottish Bishops: Down to the Year 1688, (London, 1924)
 Watt, D.E.R., Fasti Ecclesiae Scotinanae Medii Aevi ad annum 1638, 2nd Draft, (St Andrews, 1969)

12th-century births
1203 deaths
Bishops of Moray
12th-century Scottish Roman Catholic bishops
13th-century Scottish Roman Catholic bishops